Peter Knäbel (born 2 October 1966) is a German football manager and former player.

Coaching and managerial career
Knäbel was head coach of Nationalliga B side FC Winterthur until 2000.

He also is an expert for Swiss TV's football coverage.

Knäbel was the Sporting Director of Hamburger SV. He also became the interim head coach of the club on 22 March 2015 after Josef Zinnbauer was sacked. He became the 19th head coach of Hamburg since 2000. In his debut, on 4 April 2015, Hamburg lost to Bayer Leverkusen 4–0. In the second match, on 11 April 2015, Hamburg lost to VfL Wolfsburg 2–0 and dropped down into the relegation zone. He was replaced on 15 April 2015 by Bruno Labbadia. He had lost both matches as head coach and failed to score in either match.

On 15 April 2018, Knäbel was appointed Technical Director of the youth football academy of FC Schalke 04.

Coaching record

Honours
 DFB-Pokal finalist: 1987–88

References

External links
 

1966 births
Living people
German footballers
Association football midfielders
VfL Bochum players
VfL Bochum II players
FC St. Pauli players
1. FC Saarbrücken players
TSV 1860 Munich players
FC St. Gallen players
1. FC Nürnberg players
FC Winterthur players
Bundesliga players
2. Bundesliga players
German football managers
FC Winterthur managers
Hamburger SV managers
People from Witten
Sportspeople from Arnsberg (region)
Footballers from North Rhine-Westphalia